Michael J. Rogers or M. J. Rogers could refer to:

 Mike Rogers (Michigan politician), U.S. politician
 Mike Rogers (Maryland politician), Maryland state delegate
 Michael John Rogers, English ornithologist
 Michael Rogers (actor) (born 1964), Canadian actor
 A pseudonym of film director Ray Dennis Steckler